The Sucunduri Formation is a Neoproterozoic geologic formation in Brazil. While reports made in the 1950s state that dinosaur remains were among the fossils that have been recovered from the formation, none of which referred to a specific genus, later research has questioned this interpretation. The formation crops out in Amazonas.

Authors in the 1970s assigned a Permian age to the formation, time equivalent to the Praínha Formation. This definition has been questioned, as the formation is correlated with the Prosperança Formation that overlies the Trombetas Formation. The original report says "...tentatively classed this series of beds as Cretaceous because of its resemblance to part of the Cretaceous section in Maranhão. The outcrop belt of the series is more than 200 km. wide along the Sucunduri River". According to later research, the formation is Neoproterozoic in age and was named after the Sucunduri River, tributary of the Cunumã River.

See also 
 Guiana Shield

References

Bibliography

Further reading 
 Kellner, A. L.; Campos, D. A. Brief review of dinosaur and perspectives in Brazil. Anais da Academia Brasileira de Ciências, Rio de Janeiro, v. 72, n. 4, p. 509 – 538, 2000
 L. I. Price. 1959. Dentes de Theropoda num testemunho de sonda no Estado do Amazonas [Teeth of Theropoda from test drillings in Amazonas State]. Anais da Academia Brasileira de Ciências 31:xiv

Geologic formations of Brazil
Neoproterozoic South America
Amazon basin
Formations